Gushchi is a rural locality (a selo) in Kubrinsky Selsoviet, Laksky District, Republic of Dagestan, Russia. The population was 66 as of 2010. There is 1 street.

Geography 
Gushchi is located 3 km southwest of Kumukh (the district's administrative centre) by road, on the Chitturdanikh River. Kubra and Chitur are the nearest rural localities.

Nationalities 
Laks live there.

References 

Rural localities in Laksky District